Rostislaw Kaischew (February 29, 1908 – November 19, 2002) was a Bulgarian physicochemist and a member of the Bulgarian Academy of Sciences. His most significant contributions to science were within studies of crystal growth and nucleation.

Kaischew graduated from Sofia University in 1930 and earned his PhD in Germany in 1932. He became an assistant professor in 1933, and a professor in 1947. At the Bulgarian Academy of Sciences, Kaischew founded the Institute for Physical Chemistry, and held the position of director there from its creation in 1958 until his retirement in 1989. The Institute is named after him.

See also
Wulff construction

References 
 Obituary at crystalresearch.com

External links 
 Rostislaw Kaischew Institute of Physical Chemistry, Bulgarian Academy of Sciences

Members of the Bulgarian Academy of Sciences
Bulgarian physical chemists
Sofia University alumni
Scientists from Sofia
1908 births
2002 deaths
20th-century Bulgarian scientists
Members of the German Academy of Sciences at Berlin